Tomislav Duvnjak (born 5 February 2003) is a Croatian footballer who plays for Istra 1961 as a midfielder.

Football career
On 24 July 2020 he played his first match for Dinamo Zagreb, coming on as a substitute for Lovro Majer in the 76th minute in a match against NK Varaždin.

After two years of playing for Dinamo's second-tier reserve team, Duvnjak moved to Istra 1961 in June 2022, having signed a contract until the summer of 2025.

International career
Duvnjak has played internationally for Croatia at under-14, under-15, under-16, under-17, under-19 and under-20 levels.

References

External links
 
 

2003 births
Living people
Footballers from Zagreb
Association football midfielders
Croatian footballers
Croatia youth international footballers
GNK Dinamo Zagreb players
GNK Dinamo Zagreb II players
Croatian Football League players